Kenneth Hosking (dates of birth and death unknown) was an English cricketer active in the 1930s.  Hosking, whose batting and bowling styles are unknown, played in one first-class cricket match.

Hosking made his debut for Cornwall against the Kent Second XI in the 1932 Minor Counties Championship. He continued to play minor counties cricket for Cornwall until 1934, after which he left England for the British Raj. While there he played a single first-class match for Mysore against Madras in the 1935–36 Ranji Trophy at the Gymkhana Ground, Bangalore. He scored 30 runs in Mysore's first-innings, before being dismissed by Ram Singh, while in their second-innings he was dismissed for 2 runs by Morappakam Gopalan, with Madras winning the match by 109 runs. Upon returning to England, Hosking played eight Minor Counties Championship matches for Cornwall in 1938.

References

External links
Ken Hosking at ESPNcricinfo
Ken Hosking at CricketArchive

English cricketers
Cornwall cricketers
Karnataka cricketers